Sam Jones is an American gasser drag racer. He won the C/Gas title in 1962 and 1963.

History 
Driving the Chevrolet-powered Moody & Jones 1937 Chevrolet, he won NHRA's C/GS national title at the NHRA Nationals, held at Indianapolis Raceway Park, in 1962. He also won Gas Street Eliminator at Indianapolis in 1962.  

The next year, he won a second NHRA C/GS national title, at Indianapolis, again in the Moody & Jones gasser.

References

Sources
Davis, Larry. Gasser Wars.  North Branch, MN:  Cartech, 2003, pp. 182–3.

Dragster drivers
American racing drivers